A Decade of Hits may refer to:
 A Decade of Hits (Charlie Daniels album), 1983
 A Decade of Hits 1969–1979, a compilation album by The Allman Brothers Band